Gooney bird may refer to:

 Albatross or gooney bird
 Douglas C-47 Skytrain or Gooney Bird, a military transport aircraft developed from the civilian Douglas DC-3 airliner
 Gooney Bird character in The "Hard Luck Bears" animatronic show: see Aaron Fechter

See also

 Gooney Bird Greene, the first of a series of children's novels 
 Gooney Bird and the Room Mother, a children's novel
 
 Goonies (disambiguation)
 Goon (disambiguation)
 Bird (disambiguation)